Anton Alberts (born 1970) is a South African lawyer and politician. He serves as a member of the Gauteng Provincial Legislature as leader of the Freedom Front Plus.

Early life
Anton Alberts was born in 1970. He graduated from the Randse Afrikaanse Universiteit, where he earned an LLB degree, followed by a master's degree in International Law in 1998.

Career
Alberts taught the Law at his alma mater, the University of Johannesburg, as well as Technikon South Africa (now part of the University of South Africa), the University of the Witwatersrand and Rhodes University.

He is a member of Freedom Front Plus, where he serves as the National Chairperson.  Since 2009, Alberts has served as a member of the National Assembly of South Africa.  After the 2019 general election he was elected to the Gauteng Provincial Legislature.

Personal life
Alberts resides in Gauteng, South Africa.

References

Living people
1970 births
People from Gauteng
University of Johannesburg alumni
Members of the National Assembly of South Africa
Freedom Front Plus politicians
Afrikaner people
Members of the Gauteng Provincial Legislature